Cavriago (locally ) is a comune (municipality) in the Province of Reggio Emilia in the Italian region Emilia-Romagna, located about  northwest of Bologna and about  west of Reggio Emilia.

Cavriago borders the municipalities of Bibbiano and Reggio Emilia.

Cavriago is one of the very few places in Western Europe where a monument to Vladimir Lenin stands.

Twin towns
Cavriago is twinned with:

  Bender, Moldova, since 1971

See also
Wandre Guitars

References

External links
 Official website

Cities and towns in Emilia-Romagna